KIOD (105.3 FM) is a radio station licensed to McCook, Nebraska, United States. The station airs a country music format and is currently owned by Legacy Communications, LLC.

References

External links
KIOD's website

IOD
Country radio stations in the United States